Alessandro Bettega (born 5 May 1987) is an Italian former professional footballer who played as a midfielder. He is the son of former Juventus and Italian international footballer Roberto Bettega, who also served as Juventus's vice-president.

Career
Bettega began his career is a product of the Juventus youth system and played for the youth teams alongside Claudio Marchisio, Paolo De Ceglie, Domenico Criscito and Sebastian Giovinco. He was part of their title-winning Primavera team during the 2005–06 season, and they were all promoted to the Juventus first team during the 2006–07 season, following the club's relegation to Serie B due to their involvement in the 2006 Calciopoli scandal. 

With Juventus back in the Serie A the following season, he left the club after failing to establish himself in the first team. He is currently playing for Valle del Giovenco in the Lega Pro Prima Divisione.

References

External links
 

1987 births
Italian footballers
Living people
Association football midfielders
Juventus F.C. players
A.C. Monza players
A.C.N. Siena 1904 players
Ravenna F.C. players
Footballers from Turin